Punegaon Dam, is an earthfill dam on Unanda river near Punegaon, Vani, Nashik district in the state of Maharashtra in India.

Specifications

Purpose
 Irrigation
It is used for irrigational purposes . The canal of the dam supplies water to the dry regions of Yeola taluka through the Punegaon- Daraswadi water canal.

River

The dam was constructed on Unanda River and was completed in 1998. It has three flood gates which are opened when the dam is filled with full capacity.

Manjarpada Tunnel Project

The dam supplies water for the dry regions of Yeola taluka. The water is planned to come through a 9.6 km tunnel from the Manjarpada Dam which is being constructed for the project.

This project will help with water for various purposes in the various dry villages.

See also
 Dams in Maharashtra
 List of reservoirs and dams in India

References

Dams in Nashik district
Dams completed in 1998
1998 establishments in Maharashtra